The Croatia women's national football team represents the Republic of Croatia in international football. The team is managed by the Croatian Football Federation, the governing body for football in the country.

History
After winning independence from Yugoslavia in 1991, the newly established Croatian Football Federation immediately moved toward creating separate national football teams to represent the country, which included the establishment of the women's team. Three years after the men's team debut, the women's team of Croatia officially marked their international debut, playing against neighbouring Slovenia in a friendly on 28 October 1993, where Croatia lost 2–3 away.

Since its inception, the women's team of Croatia has suffered from the lack of coverage from the increasingly successful men's side. Most of Croatia's female footballers, unlike the male ones, are made up of only amateur or part-timers, and thus they are not adequately trained. As for the result, while the men's team has been largely competitive and qualified for several UEFA European Championship and FIFA World Cup, the women's team is unable to repeat the same as the men's one, and has a tendency of being finished near bottom or bottom of the qualifications for UEFA Women's Championship and FIFA Women's World Cup.

Team image

Nicknames
The Croatia women's national football team has been known or nicknamed as the "".

Rivalry

Like the men's counterparts, the Croatian women's team also maintained a rivalry with its neighbour Serbia. However, unlike the men's, the women's team of Croatia, long suffered from lack of investment, could not demonstrate its domination against its Serbian arch-rival.

Results and fixtures

The following is a list of match results in the last 12 months, as well as any future matches that have been scheduled.

Legend

2022

2023

Official Croatia Results and Fixtures
Results and Fixtures – Soccerway.com
Results and Fixtures – FIFA.com

Coaching staff

Players

Current squad
The following players were named to the squad for the 2023 FIFA Women's World Cup qualification – UEFA Group G match against Switzerland on 26 October 2021.

Caps and goals as of 22 February 2021.

Recent call-ups
The following players were named to a squad in the last 12 months.

This list may be incomplete.

Competitive record

FIFA Women's World Cup

UEFA Women's Championship

Individual statistics

Most capped players

Top goalscorers

See also 

 Croatia women's national under-19 football team
 Croatia women's national under-17 football team
 Croatia men's national football team
 Croatia men's national football B team
 Croatia men's national under-23 football team
 Croatia men's national under-21 football team
 Croatia men's national under-20 football team
 Croatia men's national under-19 football team
 Croatia men's national under-18 football team
 Croatia men's national under-17 football team

References

External links
Official Croatia women's national football team website 
Croatia profile at FIFA.com 

 
European women's national association football teams
National